Ludmila Guzun (26 June 1961 – 16 April 2021) was a Moldovan politician, who served as a Deputy of the Moldovan Parliament for the Ungheni District.

Deputy in Parliament 
Guzun was elected to the Moldovan Parliament on 24 February 2019 representing the Democratic Party of Moldova.

Death 
On 7 April 2021, Guzun tested positive for COVID-19 and was hospitalized in intensive care. He died from complications related to the virus at 03:00 on 16 April 2021.

References 

1961 births
2021 deaths
Democratic Party of Moldova MPs
People from Fălești District
Deaths from the COVID-19 pandemic in Moldova
Moldovan MPs 2019–2023
Moldovan female MPs
21st-century Moldovan women politicians